is a Japanese actress who works in both live action as well as voice over work for anime. She is known as the voice of Sakura in Urusei Yatsura.

Filmography

Live action films
The Red Spectacles (1987) (Midori Washio)
The Black House (1999) (Dr. Hatano)
All About Lily Chou-Chou (2001)
Oh! Oku (2006) (Kuzuoka)
Hot Road (2014)
Ora, Ora Be Goin' Alone (2020)
Shikake-nin Fujieda Baian (2023) (Odai)

Animated films
Urusei Yatsura: Only You (1983) (Sakura)
Urusei Yatsura 2: Beautiful Dreamer (1984) (Sakura)
Castle in the Sky (1986) (Okami)
My Neighbor Totoro (1988) (Elementary school teacher)
MAROKO (1990) (Tamiko Yomota)

TV drama
Hissastu Hashikakenin (1985) 
Dokuganryū Masamune (1987) (Ochako)
Aoi Tokugawa Sandai (2000) (Kakubei)
Ōoku (2003–05) (Kuzuoka)
Hana Moyu (2015) (Ushio)
Come Come Everybody (2021) (Hisa Tachibana)

Anime television series and OVA
Urusei Yatsura (1981–86) (Sakura)
Gosenzo-sama Banbanzai! (1989–90) (Tamiko Yomota)

References

External links

1949 births
Living people
Japanese stage actresses
Japanese video game actresses
Japanese voice actresses
Voice actresses from Kanagawa Prefecture